General Bridges may refer to:

Charles Higbee Bridges (1873–1948), U.S. Army major general
Roy D. Bridges Jr. (born 1943), U.S. Air Force major general
Tom Bridges (1871–1939), British Army lieutenant general
William Bridges (general) (1861–1915), Australian Army major general

See also
Tobias Bridge (fl. 1650s–1670s), English Civil War general on the side of Parliament